Eusynthemis deniseae is a species of dragonfly of the family Synthemistidae,
known as the Carnarvon tigertail. 
It is a medium-sized dragonfly with black and pale yellow markings.
It inhabits streams in the vicinity of Carnarvon National Park, Queensland, Australia.

Gallery

See also
 List of Odonata species of Australia

References

Synthemistidae
Odonata of Australia
Insects of Australia
Endemic fauna of Australia
Taxa named by Günther Theischinger
Insects described in 1977